Homadaula watamomaritima is a moth in the family Galacticidae. It was described by Wolfram Mey in 2007. It is found in Kenya.

References

Endemic moths of Kenya
Moths described in 2007
Galacticidae